The 1929 Allan Cup was the Canadian senior ice hockey championship for the 1928–29 season.

Final 
Best of 3
Port Arthur 1 Montreal 1
Port Arthur 7 Montreal 2
Port Arthur 3 Montreal 0

Port Arthur Bearcats beat Montreal St. Francois Xavier 2–0, 1 tie, on series.

External links
Allan Cup archives 
Allan Cup website

Allan Cup
Allan Cup
Allan Cup 1929